Salt flats, Salt flat, Salt Flats, or Salt Flat may refer to:

Geology
Salt pan (geology), a flat expanse of ground covered with salt and other minerals
Dry lake, an ephemeral lakebed that consists of fine-grained sediments infused with alkali salts

Places
Bonneville Salt Flats in Tooele County, Utah
Salt Flat, Texas, unincorporated community in Texas, United States